Robert Graham Caple (8 December 1939 – December 2019) was an English cricketer. 

Bob Caple was a left-handed batsman who bowled right-arm off break.  He made his first-class debut for the Marylebone Cricket Club against Oxford University in 1958. This was Caple's only appearance for the Marylebone Cricket Club.

In 1959 Caple joined his home county of Middlesex, making his debut against Oxford University. Caple played his only other match for Middlesex later in the 1959 season against Cambridge University.

In 1961, Caple joined Hampshire, where he played a single match for that season's County Champions against Oxford University. From 1963 to 1967 he represented Hampshire in a further 64 first-class matches. He played his final first-class match for Hampshire in the 1967 County Championship against Leicestershire. In his 65 first-class matches for Hampshire, Caple scored 1,531 runs at a batting average of 18.22, with five half centuries and high score of 64 not out. With the ball Caple took 28 wickets at a bowling average of 35.82, with one five wicket haul of 5 for 54.

External links
Bob Caple at Cricinfo
Bob Caple at CricketArchive
Bob Caple dies in South Africa 

1939 births
2019 deaths
People from Chiswick
English cricketers
Hampshire cricketers 
Marylebone Cricket Club cricketers
Middlesex cricketers